Edgar Ismael Verdugo Osuna (born ) is a Mexican male  track cyclist. He competed in the keirin event at the 2013 UCI Track Cycling World Championships.

References

External links
 Profile at cyclingarchives.com

1994 births
Living people
Mexican track cyclists
Mexican male cyclists
Place of birth missing (living people)
Pan American Games medalists in cycling
Pan American Games bronze medalists for Mexico
Cyclists at the 2019 Pan American Games
Medalists at the 2019 Pan American Games
20th-century Mexican people
21st-century Mexican people
Competitors at the 2014 Central American and Caribbean Games